Nicholas Bergasse La Bau (July 29, 1823 – November 1, 1873) was an American lawyer and politician from New York.

Life
He was born on July 29, 1823, in Trenton, New Jersey. He graduated from Columbia College in 1844. Then he studied law, was admitted to the bar, and practiced until 1859 when he retired due to ill health. He was a lieutenant colonel of the State Militia.

He married Mary Alicia Vanderbilt (1834–1902), a daughter of Cornelius Vanderbilt, and they had several children. They lived on Staten Island. By 1863, he had recovered his health sufficiently to enter politics. He ran twice unsuccessfully for the Assembly, but in 1865 he defeated the incumbent State Senator Robert Christie Jr. by a slim margin of about 70 votes. La Bau was a member of the New York State Senate (1st D.) in 1866 and 1867. Afterwards he bought a house in Luzerne, Warren County, and was a member of the New York State Assembly (Warren Co.) in 1868 and 1869.

He died on November 1, 1873, in New York City.

Sources

1823 births
1873 deaths
Republican Party New York (state) state senators
People from Staten Island
Politicians from Trenton, New Jersey
Columbia College (New York) alumni
Republican Party members of the New York State Assembly
People from Warren County, New York
19th-century American politicians